Sir Robert David Colquhoun, 12th Baronet (15 May 1786 – 2 June 1838) served in the British Indian Army. In 1815 in present-day Almora, holding the rank of lieutenant, he organized the Kemaoon Battalion, predecessor of the 3rd Gorkha Rifles, to fight in what became known as the Gurkha War.

Colquhoun was a plant collector and early patron of the Calcutta Botanical Gardens. The evergreen genus Colquhounia was named in his honor.

There is a memorial to Colquhoun in the Holy Ghost cemetery in Basingstoke. Its headstone says that he died at sea aboard the ship Reliance.

References

British East India Company Army officers
1838 deaths
British botanists
British military personnel of the Anglo-Nepalese War
Colvin family
1786 births